Chestnut Hall, formerly known as Hotel Pennsylvania, was designed by Clarence E. Wunder, and built in 1922. Wunder is also responsible for designing Bonwit Teller at 1700 Walnut St (in 1927) and the Neuweiler Brewery (in 1913). The 10-story building's architectural style is Renaissance revival. The building consists of a steel structure, a cement and brick facade, and an entablature with accompanying cornice along the top. Once built, the building served as the Hotel Pennsylvania. In the 1940s it became known as the Hotel Philadelphian. It was sold to Sheraton Hotels in December 1946, and was renamed the Penn-Sheraton Hotel. Sheraton sold the hotel to Hertfield Hotels in October 1953, and they renamed the Penn-Sheraton very slightly, changing it to the Penn Sherwood Hotel. In 1962, the hotel rejoined Sheraton as a franchise, operating as the Sheraton Motor Inn until 1966. In June 2006 Apartment Investment and Management Company (Aimco) bought a majority stake of the property.

Chestnut Hall Apartments
Today, Chestnut Hall is located in University City in the heart of Philadelphia – next to the Wharton School of Business and the Institute of Contemporary Art. Nearly 90% of Chestnut Hall's 315 apartment homes are occupied by students (who attend the nearby Drexel University or University of Pennsylvania). Young professionals and school administrators occupy the remaining 10%.

Tenants
In addition to the residential apartment homes at Chestnut Hall, there are also five commercial spaces, totaling  of retail space - three of which are currently occupied by the University of Pennsylvania Treatment Research Center, the University of Pennsylvania Federal Credit Union, and Drinkers West.

Gallery

References

External links

 UPenn Treatment Research Center
 UPenn Federal Credit Union
 Drinker's West
 Aimco
 Chestnut Hall Apartments
Photos and video tour
 Aimco Apartments

Residential buildings in Philadelphia
Residential buildings completed in 1922
University City, Philadelphia
Hotel buildings on the National Register of Historic Places in Philadelphia